Yılanlı (Turkic: "with serpents") may refer to:

 Yılanlı, Çamlıdere, a village in the district of Çamlıdere, Ankara Province, Turkey
 Yılanlı, Kalecik, a village in the district of Kalecik, Ankara Province, Turkey
 Yılanlı Island, a Mediterranean island in Silifke ilçe of Mersin Province, Turkey
 The former name of Gurbansoltan Eje, Turkmenistan
 Yılanlı Sütun, the Turkish name of the Serpent Column in Istanbul, Turkey
 Yılanlı, Köprüköy